Hsieh Su-wei and Peng Shuai were the defending champions, but lost in the third round to Tímea Babos and Kristina Mladenovic.

Sara Errani and Roberta Vinci defeated Babos and Mladenovic in the final, 6–1, 6–3 to win the ladies' doubles tennis title at the 2014 Wimbledon Championships. With this victory the Italian pair completed a Career Grand Slam, becoming only the fifth pair in tennis history to complete the feat.

Seeds

  Hsieh Su-wei /  Peng Shuai (third round)
  Sara Errani /  Roberta Vinci (champions)
  Květa Peschke /  Katarina Srebotnik (first round)
  Cara Black /  Sania Mirza (second round)
  Ekaterina Makarova /  Elena Vesnina (third round)
  Ashleigh Barty /  Casey Dellacqua (quarterfinals)
  Raquel Kops-Jones /  Abigail Spears (third round)
  Serena Williams /  Venus Williams (second round, retired)
  Andrea Hlaváčková /  Zheng Jie (semifinals)
  Julia Görges /  Anna-Lena Grönefeld (quarterfinals)
  Alla Kudryavtseva /  Anastasia Rodionova (quarterfinals)
  Anabel Medina Garrigues /  Yaroslava Shvedova (third round)
  Lucie Hradecká /  Michaëlla Krajicek (second round)
  Tímea Babos /  Kristina Mladenovic (final)
  Liezel Huber /  Lisa Raymond (second round)
  Garbiñe Muguruza /  Carla Suárez Navarro (third round)

Qualifying

Draw

Finals

Top half

Section 1

Section 2

Bottom half

Section 3

Section 4

References

External links

2014 Wimbledon Championships on WTAtennis.com
2014 Wimbledon Championships – Women's draws and results at the International Tennis Federation

Women's Doubles
Wimbledon Championship by year – Women's doubles
Wimbledon Championships
Wimbledon Championships